The Stanley Marathon is a marathon race in Stanley, Falkland Islands.  It is the southernmost AIMS-certified marathon in the world.  Run annually since 2005, and internationally accredited since 2006, it is considered difficult due to variable weather and strong prevailing winds.

Past winners
Key:

References

External links
Official website

Marathons in South America
Athletics in the Falkland Islands